Morgan James Publishing is an American independent book publisher and distributor, specializing in non-fiction, fiction, faith and kids categories.

History
The company was founded in 2003 in Virginia by David L. Hancock. In their early years, Morgan James provided a hybrid of traditional publishing and a subsidy publisher model in which entrepreneurial business nonfiction authors pre-paid fees against the publisher's royalties to be published. Hancock became business partners with Guerrilla Marketing author Jay Conrad Levinson and together they published a series of non-fiction books. 

In December 2008, the company was invited by NASDAQ to ring the opening bell and to recognize the book Do Your Giving While You Are Living by Eva Haller, which the company promotes.

In September 2013, the company launched an E-book bundling program. Morgan James Publishing chose BitLit, an online platform as the partner the program.

In February 2015, the company signed a partnering agreement with Aerbook, and the Aer.io Retail Network to offer excerpts and sales of its titles using social media.

In August 2018, Morgan James Publishing announced a partnership with Publica. Publishers Weekly, the international news magazine of book publishing and bookselling, listed the publishing house as one of the fastest-growing independent publishers of 2014, 2015 and 2018.

Publishing
Morgan James Publishing reports that it receives an average of 5,000 manuscript proposals each year and accepts and publishes an average of 150.

A number of the company's books have charted on The New York Times Best Seller list, including The AdSense Code by Joel Comm (2006), Launch: An Internet Millionaire's Secret Formula To Sell Almost Anything Online, Build A Business You Love, And Live The Life Of Your Dreams by Jeff Walker (#1 Best-Seller in Advice, How-to, and Miscellaneous July 20, 2014) The Millionaire Messenger: Make a Difference and a Fortune Sharing Your Advice published on March 7, 2011 by Brendon Burchard (#1 Best-Seller in Paperback Advice/Misc, April 3–10, 2011).

Notable authors
 Brendon Burchard
 Joel Comm
 Diane DiResta

See also
 List of English-language book publishing companies

References

External links
 
 

Book publishing companies based in New York (state)
Publishing companies based in New York City
Publishing companies established in 2003
2003 establishments in Virginia